Omorgus lobicollis is a species of hide beetle in the subfamily Omorginae and subgenus Afromorgus.

References

lobicollis
Beetles described in 1927